Mikhail Vasilyevich Butashevich-Petrashevsky (– ), commonly known as Mikhail Petrashevsky, was a Russian revolutionary and Utopian theorist.

Biography

Early life
Mikhail Petrashevsky graduated from the Tsarskoye Selo Lyceum (1839) and Saint Petersburg State University with a degree in law (1841). He was then employed as a translator and interpreter at the Ministry of Foreign Affairs.

Petrashevsky is known to have edited and authored most of the theoretical articles for the Pocket Dictionary of Foreign Words (1846), which popularized democratic and materialist ideas and principles of utopian socialism.

Political activism & Petrashevsky Circle

In 1844, Petrashevsky's apartment became the venue for social gatherings of intellectuals, which from 1845 took place on a weekly basis. These meetings were later dubbed pyatnitsy ("Fridays") and those attending them would be known as Petrashevtsy. The latter came to Petrashevsky's house and used his personal library, which contained banned books on materialist philosophy, utopian socialism, and history of revolutionary movements.

Among the well-known members of the young intelligentsia who participated in the Petroshevsky Circle was the writer Fyodor Dostoevsky, who belonged to the circle during the 1840s.

In late 1848 Mikhail Petrashevsky took part in meetings aimed at creating a secret society.

Mock execution and exile

In 1849, Mikhail Petrashevsky was arrested and sentenced to death. Together with the other Petrashevtsy he was taken to the parade ground of the Semionovsky Regiment in Saint Petersburg, the usual place for public executions, and tied to the pole. At the last moment the execution was stopped and it was revealed that his sentence had been commuted to katorga for an unspecified term. He was sent to Eastern Siberia to serve his sentence.

In 1856, Petrashevsky's status was changed to that of an exile settler. He lived in Irkutsk, where he founded a newspaper called Amur in 1860.

Later life and death
In February 1860, Petrashevsky was banished to the Minusinsk district for speaking out against the abuse of power by local officials and he died there six years later.

Political work
Petrashevsky considered himself a follower of Charles Fourier and spoke for democratisation of the Russian political system and liberation of the peasantry with their lands. He advocated long preparatory work among the masses for revolutionary struggle.

As most members of the Russian intelligentsia, their commitment to 'the people' was abstract; being unsure of individual men but loving mankind. Petrashevsky summed this up by proclaiming: 'unable to find anything in either women or men worthy of my adherence, I have turned to devote myself to the service of humanity'.

References

Bibliography
Evans, John L. The Petraševskij Circle 1845-1849. The Hague: Mouton, 1974.
 

1821 births
1866 deaths
Fourierists
Politicians from Saint Petersburg
People from Sankt-Peterburgsky Uyezd
Russian revolutionaries
Linguists from Russia
Tsarskoye Selo Lyceum alumni
Saint Petersburg State University alumni
Russian exiles in the Russian Empire